Hvítárvatn ("white river lake"; also known as Hvítárlón , "white river lagoon") is a lake in the Highlands of Iceland and the source of the glacial river Hvítá, Árnessýsla.

There are some rivers and lakes with the Icelandic adjective hvítur (white) in their name. This is explained by the source of most of Iceland's freshwater, originating from glaciers which make the water light in colour.

See also
List of lakes of Iceland
Geography of Iceland

References

External links 
 Photo

Lakes of Iceland
Rift lakes of Iceland